Helmut Dietl (22 June 1944 – 30 March 2015) was a German film director and author from Bad Wiessee.

Work 
After leaving grammar school in 1958, Dietl completed a degree in theatre studies and history of art. He then became head of photography and later assistant director to the Munich Kammerspiele theatre.  He first achieved directorial success with the TV series Monaco Franze, eventually moving on to create several notable films with the aid of Patrick Süskind's writing.

In 1998, he was a member of the judging panel at the 48th Berlin International Film Festival.

He died in Munich on 30 March 2015.

Selected filmography

Awards
1996 Bavarian Film Awards, Best Director
2013 Deutscher Filmpreis, lifetime achievement award
2014 Bambi Award, lifetime achievement award

References

External links

1944 births
2015 deaths
People from Miesbach (district)
Film directors from Munich
German television directors
Deaths from cancer in Germany
Best Director German Film Award winners
Recipients of the Cross of the Order of Merit of the Federal Republic of Germany